Sargocentron ittodai, the samurai squirrelfish, is a nocturnal species of squirrelfish belonging to the genus of Sargocentron. It is found in the Indo-Pacific region, in the Red Sea and Natal, from South Africa to the Marquesan Islands, and north from Southern Japan and the Ogasawara Islands, south to New South Wales, Australia. It inhabits outer reef slopes. It can be found either solitary or in groups. It mainly feeds on benthic crabs and shrimps.

References

ittodai
Fish of the Pacific Ocean
Taxa named by David Starr Jordan
 Fish of the Indian Ocean
Taxa named by Henry Weed Fowler